Salisbury is a constituency represented in the House of Commons of the UK Parliament since 2010 by John Glen of the Conservative Party.

History
From 1295, (the Model Parliament) a form of this constituency on a narrower area, the Parliamentary borough of Salisbury, returned two MPs to the House of Commons of England Elections were held using the bloc vote system.  This afforded the ability for wealthy male townsfolk who owned property rated at more than £2 a year liability in Land Tax to vote in the county and borough (if they met the requirements of both systems).  The franchise (right to vote) in the town was generally restricted to male tradespersons and professionals within the central town wards, however in medieval elections would have been the aldermen.

The borough constituency co-existed with a neighbouring minuscule-electorate seat described towards its Great Reform Act abolition as a rotten borough: Old Sarum that covered the mostly abandoned Roman citadel to the northeast.

Under the Redistribution of Seats Act 1885, the borough's representation was reduced to one member. The parliamentary borough of Salisbury was abolished for the 1918 general election however the name transferred immediately to a new county division.

Boundaries 

1918–1950: The Municipal Boroughs of Salisbury and Wilton, and the Rural Districts of Amesbury, Salisbury, Tisbury, and Wilton.

1950–1983: The Municipal Boroughs of Salisbury and Wilton, and the Rural Districts of Amesbury, and Salisbury and Wilton.

1983–2010: The District of Salisbury wards of Alderbury, Amesbury, Bemerton, Bishopdown, Bulford, Chalke Valley, Donhead, Downton, Durrington, Ebble, Fisherton and Bemerton Village, Fonthill, Fovant, Harnham, Idmiston, Laverstock, Milford, Nadder, Redlynch, St Edmund, St Mark, St Martin, St Paul, Stratford, Till Valley, Tisbury, Upper Bourne, Whiteparish, Wilton, Winterbourne, Winterslow, Woodford Valley, and Wylye.

2010–present: The District of Salisbury wards of Alderbury and Whiteparish, Amesbury East, Amesbury West, Bemerton, Bishopdown, Chalke Valley, Downton and Redlynch, Ebble, Fisherton and Bemerton Village, Harnham East, Harnham West, Laverstock, Lower Wylye and Woodford Valley, St Edmund and Milford, St Francis and Stratford, St Martin and Milford, St Paul, Till Valley and Wylye, Upper Bourne, Idmiston and Winterbourne, Wilton, and Winterslow.

The constituency is based around the city of Salisbury in Wiltshire. A large portion of the former Salisbury district, excluding a part to the west, is included within the constituency.

Downton (listed above) was a former borough constituency until abolished as a rotten borough, like Old Sarum, in 1832.

Traditions 
According to a local tradition, the Member of Parliament for Salisbury sings the song The Vly be on the Turmut from the balcony of the White Hart Hotel in St John's Street after winning each Parliamentary election.

Constituency profile
The constituency consists of Census Output Areas of one local government district with a working population whose income is close to the national average and lower than average reliance upon social housing.  At the end of 2012 the unemployment rate in the constituency stood as 1.6% of the population claiming jobseekers allowance, compared to the regional average of 2.5%.

The rural county as a whole has a low 14.8% of its population without a car, 18.6% of the population without qualifications and a high 29.5% with level 4 qualifications or above.  In terms of tenure across the whole county 67.5% of homes are owned outright or on a mortgage as at the 2011 census.

Members of Parliament 
 Constituency created 1295

MPs 1295–1660

MPs 1660–1885

MPs since 1885

Elections

Elections in the 2010s

Elections in the 2000s

Elections in the 1990s

Elections in the 1980s

Elections in the 1970s

Elections in the 1960s

Elections in the 1950s

Elections in the 1940s

Elections in the 1930s

Elections in the 1920s

Elections in the 1910s

Elections in the 1900s

Elections in the 1890s

 Caused by Hulse's resignation.

Elections in the 1880s

 Caused by Grenfell's appointment as a Groom in Waiting to Queen Victoria.

Elections in the 1870s

Elections in the 1860s

 Caused by Hamilton's resignation.

Elections in the 1850s

 

 

 

 
 

 Caused by Wall's death

Elections in the 1840s

 
 
 

 

 Caused by Hussey's resignation by accepting the office of Steward of the Chiltern Hundreds

 
 

 Caused by Wyndham's death.

 
 

 Caused by Brodie's resignation by accepting the office of Steward of the Chiltern Hundreds. Bouverie retired during polling.

Elections in the 1830s

 
 

 
 

 
 
 

 On petition, Wyndham was unseated in favour of Pleydell-Bouverie

See also 
 List of parliamentary constituencies in Wiltshire

Notes

References

Sources 

 
Parliamentary constituencies in Wiltshire
Constituencies of the Parliament of the United Kingdom established in 1295